Set-off may refer to:

 Set-off (architecture), horizontal line shown on a floorplan indicating a reduced wall thickness, and consequently the part of the thicker portion appears projecting before the thinner
 Set-off (law), reduction of a claim by deducting the amount of a valid countervailing claim
 Set-off (printing), ink passing from one printed sheet to another because the ink has not had the chance to dry, which causes the sheets of paper to stick together

See also
 Offset (disambiguation)